The 1903 College Football All-America team is composed of various organizations that chose College Football All-America Teams that season. The organizations and individuals that chose the teams included Collier's Weekly selected by Walter Camp, Caspar Whitney for Outing magazine, Charles Chadwick and Fielding H. Yost.

Of the 15 players who have been recognized by the NCAA as "consensus" All-Americans for the 1903 season, 12 played for teams in the Ivy League, and nine played for the "Big Four" teams of the era—Harvard, Princeton, Yale, and Penn.  The only three consensus All-Americans from schools outside the Ivy League were tackle Fred Schacht of Minnesota, quarterback James Johnson of Carlisle, and halfback Willie Heston of Michigan.

Five players were selected as first-team All-Americans by at least four of the known selectors: guard John DeWitt of Princeton (5), center Henry Hooper of Dartmouth (5), end Charles D. Rafferty of Yale (5), halfback Willie Heston of Michigan (4), and tackle James Hogan of Yale (4).  Hooper, who was a freshman in 1903, died three months after the football season ended, following an attack of appendicitis.

In 2008, Sports Illustrated sought to answer the question, "Who would have won the Heisman from 1900-1934?" Its selection for 1903 was Willie Heston of Michigan described as "the nation's finest back."

All-Americans of 1903

Ends
Howard Henry, Princeton (WC-1; CW-1; FY-2; CC-1)
Charles D. Rafferty, Yale (WC-1; CW-1; FY-1; CC-1; SA-1)
Ralph Tipton Davis, Princeton (WC-2)
Tom Shevlin, Yale (College Football Hall of Fame) (WC-2; CW-2; FY-2; SA-1)
Curtis Redden, Michigan (WC-3)
Eddie Rogers, Minnesota (WC-3)
Edward Bowditch, Harvard (CW-2; FY-1)

Tackles
Daniel Knowlton, Harvard (WC-1; CW-1; FY-2)
James Hogan, Yale (WC-1; FY-1; CC-1; SA-1)
Fred Schacht, Minnesota (WC-2; CW-1; FY-2)
Tom Thorp, Columbia (WC-2; CC-1)
Leigh C. Turner, Dartmouth (WC-3; CW-2)
Joseph Maddock, Michigan (WC-3; CW-2; FY-1; SA-1)

Guards

John DeWitt, Princeton (College Football Hall of Fame) (WC-1; CW-1; FY-1; CC-1; SA-1)
Andrew Marshall, Harvard (WC-1; CW-2; FY-2; CC-1)
James Bloomer, Yale (CW-1; FY-1; SA-1)
Napoleon Riley, Army (WC-2)
Joseph Gilman, Dartmouth (WC-2; CW-2)
Dillon, Princeton (FY-2)
Wilson Bertke, Wisconsin (WC-3)
Frank Piekarski, Penn (WC-3)

Centers
Henry Hooper, Dartmouth (WC-1; CW-1; FY-1; CC-1; SA-1)
Moses L. Strathern, Minnesota (WC-2)
Bruce, Columbia (WC-3)
Short, Princeton (CW-2; FY-2)

Quarterbacks
James Johnson, Carlisle (College Football Hall of Fame) (WC-1; CW-2)
Myron E. Witham, Dartmouth (WC-2; CW-1)
Foster Rockwell, Yale (FY-2; CC-1)
Sigmund Harris, Minnesota (WC-3; FY-1)
Alfred Brewster, Cornell (SA-1)

Halfbacks

Willie Heston, Michigan (College Football Hall of Fame) (WC-1; CW-1; FY-1; SA-1)
Dana Kafer, Princeton (WC-1; CW-1; FY-2; SA-1)
Harold Metcalf, Yale (CC-1)
John Donaldson Nichols, Harvard (WC-2; FY-2)
Herb Graver, Michigan (WC-3)
Tom Stankard, Holy Cross (WC-3)
Edward Farnsworth, Army (CW-2)
James Vaughn, Dartmouth (CW-2)

Fullbacks
Richard Shore Smith, Columbia (WC-1; FY-2)
Ledyard Mitchell, Yale (WC-2 [hb]; CW-1; FY-1 [hb]; CC-1 [hb])
Henry Schoellkopf, Harvard (FY-1; CC-1; SA-1)
R. Miller, Princeton (WC-2)
Louis J. Salmon, Notre Dame (WC-3)
Frederick A. Prince, Army (CW-2)

Key
 WC = Collier's Weekly as selected by Walter Camp
 CW = Caspar Whitney, for Outing magazine
 FY = Fielding H. Yost, coach of the University of Michigan football team
 CC = Charles Chadwick, described as "one of the best known coaches and football experts in this country"
 SA = San Antonio Daily Light
 Bold – Consensus All-American
 1 – First Team Selection
 2 – Second Team Selection
 3 – Third Team Selection

See also
 1903 All-Southern college football team
 1903 All-Western college football team

References

All-America Team
College Football All-America Teams